Stationary Low-Power Reactor Number One, also known as SL-1 or the Argonne Low Power Reactor (ALPR), was a United States Army experimental nuclear reactor in the western United States at the National Reactor Testing Station (NRTS) in Idaho west of Idaho Falls, now the Idaho National Laboratory. It experienced a steam explosion on the night of January 3, 1961, killing all three of its young military operators, and pinning one of them to the ceiling of the facility with a reactor vessel plug. The event is the only reactor accident in U.S. history that resulted in immediate fatalities.

The direct cause was the over-withdrawal of the central control rod, responsible for absorbing neutrons in the reactor's core. About  of fission products were released into the atmosphere.

The reactor was intended to provide electrical power and heat for small, remote military facilities, such as radar sites near the Arctic Circle, and those in the DEW Line. The design power was 3 MW (thermal), but some 4.7 MW tests were performed in the months prior to the accident. Operating power was 200 kW electrical and 400 kW thermal for space heating. During the accident, the core power level reached nearly 20 GW in just four milliseconds, precipitating the steam explosion.

Design and operations
From 1954 to 1955, the U.S. Army evaluated their need for nuclear reactor plants that would be operable in remote regions of the Arctic. The reactors were to replace diesel generators and boilers that provided electricity and space heating for the Army's radar stations. The Army Reactors Branch formed the guidelines for the project and contracted with Argonne National Laboratory (ANL) to design, build, and test a prototype reactor plant to be called the Argonne Low Power Reactor (ALPR). Some of the more important criteria included:
 All components able to be transported by air
 All components limited to packages measuring and weighing 
 Use of standard components
 Minimal on-site construction
 Simplicity and reliability
 Adaptable to the Arctic permafrost region
 3-year fuel operating lifetime per core loading

The prototype was constructed at the National Reactor Testing Station west of Idaho Falls from July 1957 to July 1958. It went critical on August 11, 1958, became operational on October 24, and was formally dedicated on December 2, 1958. The 3 MW (thermal) boiling water reactor (BWR) used 93.20% highly enriched uranium fuel. It operated with natural circulation, using light water as a coolant (vs. heavy water) and moderator. ANL used its experience from the BORAX experiments to design the reactor. The circulating water system operated at  flowing through fuel plates of uranium-aluminum alloy. The plant was turned over to the Army for training and operating experience in December 1958 after extensive testing, with Combustion Engineering Incorporated (CEI) acting as the lead contractor beginning February 5, 1959.

Trainees in the Army Reactor Training Program included members of the Army, called cadre, who were the primary plant operators. Many maritime civilians also trained along with a few Air Force and Navy personnel. While plant operation was generally done by the cadre in two-man crews, any development of the reactor was to be supervised directly by CEI staff. CEI decided to perform development work on the reactor as recent as the latter half of 1960 in which the reactor was to be operated at 4.7 MWthermal for a "PL-1 condenser test." As the reactor core aged and boron neutron poison strips corroded and flaked off, CEI calculated that about 18% of the boron in the core had been lost. This resulted in the addition of cadmium sheets (also a poison) on November 11, 1960, which were installed "to several tee slot positions to increase reactor shutdown margin."

The reactor building, known as ARA-602, was made of plate steel, most of which had a thickness of 1/4 inch (6 mm). Access to the building was provided by an ordinary door through an enclosed exterior stairwell from ARA-603, the Support Facilities Building. An emergency exit door was also included, with an exterior stairwell going to the ground level. The reactor building was not a pressure-type containment shell as would have been used for reactors located in populated areas. Nevertheless, the building was able to contain most of the radioactive particles released by the eventual explosion.

The reactor core structure was built for a capacity of 59 fuel assemblies, one startup neutron source assembly, and nine control rods. The core in use, however, had 40 fuel elements and was controlled by five cruciform rods. The five active rods were in the shape of a plus symbol (+) in cross section: one in the center (Rod Number 9), and four on the periphery of the active core (Rods 1, 3, 5, and 7). The 40 fuel assemblies were composed of nine fuel plates each. The initial loading of the 40 assembly core was highly enriched with 93.2% uranium-235 and contained  of U-235.

The deliberate choice of a smaller fuel loading element made the region near the center more active than it would have been with 59 fuel assemblies. The four outer control rods were not even used in the smaller core after tests concluded they were not necessary. In the operating SL-1 core, Rods 2, 4, 6, and 8 were dummy rods, had newly-installed cadmium shims, or were filled with test sensors, and were shaped like the capital letter T. The effort to minimize the size of the core gave Rod 9 an abnormally large reactivity worth.

Accident and response
On Tuesday, January 3, 1961, SL-1 was being prepared for restart after a shutdown of eleven days over the holidays. Maintenance procedures required that Rod 9 be manually withdrawn a few inches to reconnect it to its drive mechanism. At 9:01 pm MST, this rod was suddenly withdrawn too far, causing SL-1 to go prompt critical instantly. In four milliseconds, the heat generated by the resulting enormous power excursion caused fuel inside the core to melt and to explosively vaporize. With six holes on the top of the reactor vessel, high pressure water and steam sprayed the entire room with radioactive debris from the damaged core. The excursion, steam explosion, and vessel movement took two to four seconds.

The spray of water and steam knocked two operators onto the floor, killing one and severely injuring another. The No. 7 shield plug from the top of the reactor vessel impaled the third man through his groin and exited his shoulder, pinning him to the ceiling. The victims were Army Specialists Richard Leroy McKinley (age 27) and John A. Byrnes (age 22), and Navy Seabee Construction Electrician First Class (CE1) Richard C. Legg (age 26). It was later established by author Todd Tucker that Byrnes (the reactor operator) had lifted the rod and caused the excursion; Legg (the shift supervisor) was standing on top of the reactor vessel and was impaled and pinned to the ceiling; and McKinley (the trainee) stood nearby. Only McKinley was found alive, unconscious and in deep shock, by rescuers. This was consistent with the analysis of the SL-1 Board of Investigation and with the results of the autopsies, which suggested that Byrnes and Legg died instantly, while McKinley showed signs of diffuse bleeding within his scalp, indicating he survived approximately two hours before succumbing to his wounds. All three men succumbed to their physical trauma.

Reactor principles and events
Early press reports indicated that the explosion may have been due to a chemical reaction, but that was shortly ruled out. Fast neutron activation had occurred to various materials in the room, indicating a nuclear power excursion unlike a properly operating reactor.

In a thermal-neutron reactor such as SL-1, neutrons are moderated (slowed down) to control the nuclear fission process and increase the likelihood of fission with U-235 fuel. Without sufficient moderator, cores such as SL-1 would be unable to sustain a nuclear chain reaction. When the moderator is removed from the core, the chain reaction decreases. Water, when used as a moderator, is maintained under high pressure to keep it liquid. Steam formation in the channels around the nuclear fuel suppresses the chain reaction.

Another control is the effect of the delayed neutrons on the chain reaction in the core. Most neutrons (the  neutrons) are produced nearly instantaneously by the fission of U-235. But a few—approximately 0.7 percent in a U-235-fueled reactor operating at steady-state—are produced through the relatively slow radioactive decay of certain fission products. (These fission products are trapped inside the fuel plates in close proximity to the uranium-235 fuel.) The delayed production of a fraction of the neutrons enables reactor power changes to be controlled on a time scale amenable to humans and machinery.

In the case of an ejected control assembly or poison, it is possible for the reactor to become critical  (i.e. prompt critical). When the reactor is prompt critical, the time to double the power is of the order of 10 microseconds. The duration necessary for temperature to follow the power level depends on the design of the reactor core. Typically, the coolant temperature lags behind the power by 3 to 5 seconds in a conventional LWR. In the SL-1 design, it was about 6 milliseconds before steam formation started.

SL-1 was constructed with a main central control rod that was capable of producing a very large excess reactivity if it were completely removed. The extra rod worth was in part due to the decision to load only 40 of the 59 fuel assemblies with nuclear fuel, thus making the prototype reactor core more active in the center. In normal operation control rods are withdrawn only far enough to generate sufficient reactivity for a sustained nuclear reaction and power generation. In this accident, however, the additional reactivity was enough to take the reactor prompt critical within an estimated 4 milliseconds. That was too fast for the heat from the fuel to permeate the aluminum cladding and boil enough water to fully stop the power growth in all parts of the core via negative moderator temperature and void feedback.

Post-accident analysis concluded that the final control method (i.e., dissipation of the prompt critical state and the end of the sustained nuclear chain reaction) occurred by means of catastrophic core disassembly: destructive melting, vaporization, and consequent conventional explosive expansion of the parts of the reactor core where the greatest amount of heat was being produced most quickly. It was estimated that this core heating and vaporization process happened in about 7.5 milliseconds, before enough steam had been formed to shut down the reaction, beating the steam shutdown by a few milliseconds. A key statistic makes it clear why the core blew apart: the reactor designed for a 3 MW power output operated momentarily at a peak of about 20 GW, a power density over 6,000 times higher than its safe operating limit. This criticality accident is estimated to have produced 4.4 × 1018 fissions, or about  energy.

Events after the power excursion

Heat sensors above the reactor set off an alarm at the NRTS security facility at 9:01 pm MST, the time of the accident. False alarms had occurred in the morning and afternoon that same day. The response team of six firemen (Ken Dearden Asst Chief, Mel Hess Lt., Bob Archer, Carl Johnson, Egon Lamprecht, Gerald Stuart, & Vern Conlon) arrived nine minutes later, expecting another false alarm. They noticed nothing unusual at first, with only a little steam rising from the building, normal for the cold  night. The firefighters, unable to hail anyone inside the SL-1 facility, had a security guard open the gate for them. They donned their Scott Air-Paks, and arrived at the Support Facilities Building to investigate.

The building appeared normal, but was unoccupied. Three mugs of warm coffee were in the break room and three jackets were hanging nearby. They entered the reactor control room and noticed a radiation warning light. Their handheld radiation detector jumped sharply above its maximum range as they were climbing the stairs to SL-1's reactor operating floor level. This prompted a retreat for a second radiation detector. The second radiation detector also maxed out at its 200 röntgens per hour (R/hr) scale as they ascended again. They peered into the reactor room before withdrawing.

At 9:17 pm, a health physicist arrived; he and Assistant Chief Moshberger, both wearing air tanks and masks with positive pressure in the mask to force out any potential contaminants, approached the reactor building stairs. Their detectors read 25 röntgens per hour (R/hr) as they started up the stairs, and they withdrew. Finding a higher-scale ion chamber detector, the pair reached the top of the stairs to look inside the reactor room for the three missing men. Their Jordan Radector AG-500 meter pegged at 500 R/hr on the way up. They saw a dim, humid, wet, operating floor strewn with rocks and steel punchings, twisted metal, and debris scattered.

 Coming from nearby Idaho Falls, the lead SL-1 health physicist, Ed Vallario, and Paul Duckworth, the SL-1 Operations Supervisor, arrived at SL-1 around 10:30 pm. The two donned air packs and went quickly into the administration building, through the support building, and up the stairs to the reactor floor. Vallario heard the moaning of McKinley while half-way up the stairs. Finding him and a second operator on the floor who appeared to be dead, the two decided to return to the checkpoint and get help for the bleeding McKinley.

The two were joined by three health physicists who donned air packs and went with them back to the reactor floor. The masks on their air packs were fogging up, limiting visibility. McKinley was moving slightly, but his body was partially covered with metal debris, which the rescuers had to quickly remove in order to carry him with a stretcher. Vallario moved debris in his attempt to find the missing crewman. Another man checked the pulse of Byrnes and announced that he was dead. The body of Byrnes was partially covered with steel pellets and blood.

Three men attempted to remove McKinley via the outside stairs, sending one man outside to meet them with a truck. But after carrying McKinley across the operating floor to the exit, they discovered equipment blocking the emergency exit door. This forced the rescuers to reverse course and use the main stairs.

During the movement of McKinley, two men had their Scott Air Paks freeze up and cease to work. Duckworth evacuated due to the malfunction, while Vallario removed his mask and breathed contaminated air to complete the evacuation of McKinley. The rescue took about three minutes.

The evacuation of McKinley turned quickly into a major radiological problem. McKinley was first shuttled into a panel truck and then into the back of an ambulance. The on-call nurse, Helen Leisen, tending to the patient in the back of the ambulance, heard at least a faint breath, perhaps his last. But before the vehicle made it to nearby Highway 20, the AEC doctor had the nurse evacuate and, entering the ambulance, found no pulse. He pronounced the man dead at 11:14 pm. The contaminated ambulance, with the body of McKinley, was driven out into the desert and abandoned for several hours.

Four men had entered into the reactor building at 10:38 pm and found the third man. Legg was discovered last because he was pinned to the ceiling above the reactor by a shield plug and not easily recognizable.

Extensive decontamination was conducted that night. Approximately 30 of the first responders took showers, scrubbed their hands with potassium permanganate, and changed their clothes. The body in the ambulance was later disrobed and returned to the ambulance, which took it to a nearby facility for storage and autopsy.

On the night of January 4, a team of six volunteers worked in pairs to recover Byrnes' body from the SL-1 operating floor. It was taken, also by ambulance, to the same facility.

After four days of planning, the third body, by far the most contaminated, was retrieved. Modifications to the reactor room had to be performed by a welder inside a lead shielded box attached to a crane. On January 9, in relays of two at a time, a team of ten men, allowed no more than 65 seconds exposure each, used sharp hooks on the end of long poles to pull Legg's body free of the No. 7 shield plug, dropping it onto a  stretcher attached to a crane outside the building.

Radioactive copper 64Cu from a cigarette lighter screw on McKinley and a brass watch band buckle from Byrnes both proved that the reactor had indeed gone prompt critical. This was confirmed with several other readings, including gold 198Au from Legg's wedding ring. Nuclear accident dosimeters inside the reactor plant and particles of uranium from the victim's clothes also provided evidence of the excursion. Prior to the discovery of neutron-activated elements in the men's belongings, scientists had doubted that a nuclear excursion had occurred, believing the reactor was inherently safe. Strontium-91, a major fission product, was also found with the uranium particles. These findings ruled out early speculation that a chemical explosion caused the accident.

Some sources and eyewitness accounts confuse the names and positions of each victim. In Idaho Falls: The untold story of America's first nuclear accident, the author indicates that the rescue teams identified Byrnes as the man found still alive, believing that Legg's body was the one found next to the reactor shield and recovered the night after the accident, and that McKinley was impaled by the control rod to the ceiling directly above the reactor. The misidentification, caused by the severe blast injuries to the victims, was rectified during the autopsies conducted by Clarence Lushbaugh, but this caused confusion for some time.

The seven rescuers who carried McKinley and received Carnegie Hero awards from the Carnegie Hero Fund were: Paul Duckworth, the SL-1 Operations Supervisor; Sidney Cohen, the SL-1 Test supervisor; William Rausch, SL-1 Assistant Operations Supervisor; Ed Vallario, SL-1 Health Physicist; William Gammill, the on-duty AEC Site Survey Chief; Lovell J. Callister, health physicist, and Delos E. Richards, health physics technician.

Cause
One of the required maintenance procedures called for Rod 9 to be manually withdrawn approximately four inches (10 cm) in order to attach it to the automated control mechanism from which it had been disconnected. The most common theories proposed for the withdrawal of the rod are (1) sabotage or suicide by one of the operators, (2) a murder-suicide involving an affair with the wife of one of the other operators, (3) inadvertent withdrawal of the main control rod, or (4) an intentional attempt to "exercise" the rod (to make it travel more smoothly within its sheath). The maintenance logs do not address what the technicians were attempting to do, and thus the actual cause of the accident will never be known. However, it seems unlikely that it was a suicide.

Post-accident experiments were conducted with an identically weighted mock control rod to determine whether it was possible or feasible for one or two men to have withdrawn Rod 9 by 20 inches. Experiments included a simulation of the possibility that the  central rod was stuck and one man freed it himself, reproducing the scenario that investigators considered the best explanation: Byrnes broke the control rod loose and withdrew it accidentally, killing all three men. When testing the theory that Rod 9 was rapidly withdrawn manually, three men took part in timed trials and their efforts were compared to the energy of the nuclear excursion that had occurred.

At SL-1, control rods would get stuck in the control rod channel sporadically. Numerous procedures were conducted to evaluate control rods to ensure they were operating properly. There were rod drop tests and scram tests of each rod, in addition to periodic rod exercising and rod withdrawals for normal operation. From February 1959 to November 18, 1960, there were 40 cases of a stuck control rod for scram and rod drop tests and about a 2.5% failure rate. From November 18 to December 23, 1960, there was a dramatic increase in stuck rods, with 23 in that time period and a 13.0% failure rate. Besides these test failures, there were an additional 21 rod-sticking incidents from February 1959 to December 1960; four of these had occurred in the last month of operation during routine rod withdrawal. Rod 9 had the best operational performance record even though it was operated more frequently than any of the other rods.

Rod sticking has been attributed to misalignment, corrosion product build-up, bearing wear, clutch wear, and drive mechanism seal wear. Many of the failure modes that caused a stuck rod during tests (like bearing and clutch wear) would apply only to a movement performed by the control rod drive mechanism. Since the No. 9 rod is centrally located, its alignment may have been better than Nos. 1, 3, 5, and 7, which were more prone to sticking. After the accident, logbooks and former plant operators were consulted to determine if there had been any rods stuck during the reassembly operation that Byrnes was performing. One person had performed this about 300 times, and another 250 times; neither had ever felt a control rod stick when being manually raised during this procedure. Furthermore, no one had ever reported a stuck rod during manual reconnection.

During congressional hearings in June 1961, the SL-1 Project Manager, W. B. Allred, admitted that the lack of supervision by CEI of SL-1 plant operation on an "around-the-clock basis" was because the Atomic Energy Commission (AEC) had rejected the idea "for budget reasons." Allred was also grilled on the matter of increased rod sticking between November 16, 1960, and the final shutdown on December 23. Of the increase, Allred stated, "I was not completely aware of significant increase" and, "I was not aware that this sharp increase had occurred." When asked who was the person responsible for informing him of the sticking problem, Allred stated that Paul Duckworth, the SL-1 Operations Supervisor, should have reported this to him but did not. When pressed, Allred stated that if he had known of the increased control rod sticking, he "would have shut the plant down for more detailed examination."

Consequences
The accident caused SL-1's design to be abandoned and future reactors to be designed so that a single control rod removal would not have the ability to produce very large excess reactivity. Today this is known as the "one stuck rod" criterion and requires complete shutdown capability even with the most reactive rod stuck in the fully withdrawn position. The documentation and procedures required for operating nuclear reactors expanded substantially, becoming far more formal as procedures that had previously taken two pages expanded to hundreds. Radiation meters were changed to allow higher ranges for emergency response activities.

Although portions of the center of SL-1's core had been vaporized briefly, very little corium was recovered. The fuel plates showed signs of catastrophic destruction leaving voids, but "no appreciable amount of glazed molten material was recovered or observed." Additionally, "There is no evidence of molten material having flowed out between the plates." It is believed that rapid cooling of the core was responsible for the small amount of molten material. There was insufficient heat generated for any corium to reach or penetrate the bottom of the reactor vessel.

Despite the SL-1 reactor building containing most of the radioactivity, iodine-131 levels on plant buildings reached fifty times background levels downwind during several days of monitoring. Radiation surveys of the Support Facilities Building, for example, indicated high contamination in halls, but light contamination in offices. Radiation exposure limits prior to the accident were 100 röntgens to save a life and 25 to save valuable property. During the response to the accident, 22 people received doses of 3 to 27 Röntgens full-body exposure. Removal of radioactive waste and disposal of the three bodies eventually exposed 790 people to harmful levels of radiation. In March 1962, the AEC awarded certificates of heroism to 32 participants in the response.

After a pause for evaluation of procedures, the Army continued its use of reactors, operating the Mobile Low-Power Reactor (ML-1), which started full power operation on February 28, 1963, becoming the smallest nuclear power plant on record to do so. This design was eventually abandoned after corrosion problems. While the tests had shown that nuclear power was likely to have lower total costs, the financial pressures of the Vietnam War caused the Army to favor lower initial costs and it stopped the development of its reactor program in 1965, although the existing reactors continued operating (MH-1A until 1977).

Cleanup
General Electric was tasked with the removal of the reactor vessel and the dismantling and cleanup of the contaminated buildings at the SL-1 project site. The site was cleaned from 1961 to 1962, removing the bulk of the contaminated debris and burying it. The massive cleanup operation included the transport of the reactor vessel to a nearby "hot shop" for extensive analysis. Other items of less importance were either disposed of or transported to decontamination sites for various kinds of cleaning. About 475 people took part in the SL-1 site cleanup, including volunteers from the U.S. Army and the Atomic Energy Commission.

The recovery operation included clearing the operating room floor of radioactive debris. The extremely high radiation areas surrounding the reactor vessel and the fan room directly above it contributed to the difficulty of recovering the reactor vessel. Remotely operated equipment, cranes, boom trucks, and safety precautions had to be developed and tested by the recovery team. Radiation surveys and photographic analysis was used to determine what items needed to be removed from the building first. Powerful vacuum cleaners, operated manually by teams of men, collected vast quantities of debris. Hot spots up to 400 R/hr were discovered and removed from the work area.

With the operating room floor relatively clean and radiation fields manageable, the manual overhead crane was employed to do a trial lift of the reactor vessel. The crane was fitted with a dial-type load indicator and the vessel was lifted a few inches. After removing a large amount of the building structure above the reactor vessel, a 60-ton Manitowoc Model 3900 crane lifted the vessel out of the building into an awaiting transport cask attached to a tractor-trailer combination with a low-boy 60-ton capacity trailer.

It was opened on May 21, 1961. The original cleanup of the site took about 24 months. The entire reactor building, contaminated materials from nearby buildings, and soil and gravel contaminated during cleanup operations were disposed of in the burial ground. The majority of buried materials consist of soils and gravel.

Recovered portions of the reactor core, including the fuel and all other parts of the reactor that were important to the accident investigation, were taken to the ANP Hot Shop for study. After the accident investigation was complete, the reactor fuel was sent to the Idaho Chemical Processing Plant for reprocessing. The reactor core minus the fuel, along with the other components sent to the Hot Shop for study, was eventually disposed of at the Radioactive Waste Management Complex.

The burial site consists of three excavations, in which a total volume of 99,000 cubic feet (2800 m3) of contaminated material was deposited. The excavations were dug as close to basalt as the equipment used would allow and ranges from eight to fourteen feet (2.4 to 4.3 m) in depth. At least two feet (0.6 m) of clean backfill was placed over each excavation. Shallow mounds of soil over the excavations were added at the completion of cleanup activities in September 1962. The site and burial mound are collectively known as United States Environmental Protection Agency Superfund Operable Unit 5-05.

Numerous radiation surveys and cleanup of the surface of the burial ground and surrounding area have been performed in the years since the SL-1 accident. Aerial surveys were performed by EG&G Las Vegas in 1974, 1982, 1990, and 1993. The Radiological and Environmental Sciences Laboratory conducted gamma radiation surveys every three to four years between 1973 and 1987 and every year between 1987 and 1994. Particle-picking at the site was performed in 1985 and 1993. Results from the surveys indicated that cesium-137 and its progeny (decay products) are the primary surface-soil contaminants. During a survey of surface soil in June 1994, "hot spots," areas of higher radioactivity, were found within the burial ground with activities ranging from 0.1 to 50 milliroentgen (mR)/hour. On November 17, 1994, the highest radiation reading measured at 2.5 feet (0.75 m) above the surface at the SL-1 burial ground was 0.5 mR/hour; local background radiation was 0.2 mR/hour. A 1995 assessment by the EPA recommended that a cap be placed over the burial mounds. The primary remedy for SL-1 was to be containment by capping with an engineered barrier constructed primarily of native materials. This remedial action was completed in 2000 and first reviewed by the EPA in 2003.

Movies and books

The U.S. government produced a film about the accident for internal use in the 1960s. The video was subsequently released and can be viewed at The Internet Archive and YouTube. SL-1 is the title of a 1983 movie, written and directed by Diane Orr and C. Larry Roberts, about the nuclear reactor explosion. Interviews with scientists, archival film, and contemporary footage, as well as slow-motion sequences, are used in the film. The events of the accident are also the subject of one book: Idaho Falls: The untold story of America's first nuclear accident (2003) and 2 chapters in Proving the Principle – A History of The Idaho National Engineering and Environmental Laboratory, 1949–1999 (2000).

In 1975, the anti-nuclear book We Almost Lost Detroit, by John G. Fuller was published, referring at one point to the Idaho Falls accident. Prompt Critical is the title of a 2012 short film, viewable on YouTube, written and directed by James Lawrence Sicard, dramatizing the events surrounding the SL-1 accident. A documentary about the accident was shown on the History Channel.

 Another author, Todd Tucker, studied the accident and published a book detailing the historical aspects of nuclear reactor programs of the U.S. military branches. Tucker used the Freedom of Information Act to obtain reports, including autopsies of the victims, writing in detail how each person died and how parts of their bodies were severed, analyzed, and buried as radioactive waste. The autopsies were performed by the same pathologist known for his work following the Cecil Kelley criticality accident. Tucker explains the reasoning behind the autopsies and the severing of victims' body parts, one of which gave off 1,500 R/hour on contact. Because the SL-1 accident killed all three of the military operators on site, Tucker calls it "the deadliest nuclear reactor incident in U.S. history."

See also

BORAX experiments, 1953–54, which proved that the transformation of water to steam would safely limit a boiling water reactor power excursion, similar to that in this incident.
International Nuclear Event Scale
List of civilian nuclear accidents
List of civilian radiation accidents
List of military nuclear accidents
List of nuclear reactors
Nuclear power debate
Nuclear safety and security
Radiation
Radioactive contamination

References

External links

"SL-1 Reactor Accident on January 3, 1961, Interim Report", May 1961. From the above page. 15.5 MB PDF.
"IDO Report on the Nuclear Incident at the SL-1 Reactor on January 3, 1961, at the National Reactor Testing Station, January 1962. 16.5 MB PDF. From the above page. This report has more accurate times for the events.

Department of Energy Document: Nuclear Reactor Testing

Buildings and structures in Butte County, Idaho
Disasters in Idaho
Energy infrastructure completed in 1958
Former nuclear power stations in the United States
Military nuclear reactors
Nuclear power plants in Idaho
Radioactively contaminated areas
Superfund sites in Idaho
1961 disasters in the United States
1961 in Idaho
Engineering failures
Nuclear accidents and incidents in the United States
Former power stations in Idaho